Horse and Rider (FCR 242) is a 1974 bronze equestrian sculpture by Elisabeth Frink.  The work was commissioned for a site in Mayfair; another cast is in Winchester.  It was described by Frink as "an ageless symbol of man and horse".

One of Frink's earliest sculptures from 1950 was also titled Horse and Rider, and she returned to this subject over decades.  A series of Frink prints from the early 1970s held by the Tate Gallery depict a horse and rider.

Frink lived in southern France in 1967 to 1970, near the Camargue.  She was inspired to create more works portraying horses; an example of a similar horse sculpture from the early 1970s is at the Cass Sculpture Foundation.

The work was commissioned in 1974 by Trafalgar House for its development at the southern end of Dover Street, London, near the junction with Piccadilly, opposite The Ritz. It was modelled in plaster at Frink's studio in Southwark then cast in bronze in 1975 at Meridian Bronze Foundry in Peckham. Frink also cast a small version , in an edition of nine in 1974.

The sculpture depicts a man riding on a horse, naked and barefoot, without tack – no saddle, bridle, or other riding equipment.  The man's right hand rests on the horse's stylised mane, with his left hand resting on the horse's left flank.  The horse is standing still on four legs, ready to walk, on a rough bronze base. The figures of man and horse are slightly stylised, with lightly defined musculature; the horse has a short mane and tail. Both have their heads turned to their left, as if looking at something.

The work was installed in Mayfair in 1975, mounted on a granite plinth. It is part of an edition of three; another cast is in Winchester.  The example in London became a Grade II listed building in September 2015. In June 2018 the sculpture was moved to the Town Square on Bond Street to mark the new entrance to the Royal Academy of Arts.

References

 Horse and Rider, Elisabeth Frink Estate
 Horse and Rider, 1969, CASS Sculpture Foundation 
 Dame Elisabeth Frink, Small Horse and Rider, 1970, Tate Gallery

1975 establishments in England
1975 sculptures
Bronze sculptures in the United Kingdom
Buildings and structures in Mayfair
Buildings and structures on Piccadilly
Equestrian statues in the United Kingdom
Grade II listed statues in the City of Westminster
Grade II listed public art
Outdoor sculptures in London
Sculptures by Elisabeth Frink